The 6th South Carolina Regiment (2nd Rifle Regiment) was authorized on 28 February 1776 in the South Carolina State Troops and was organized during the spring of 1776 as five companies of volunteers from the northwestern region of the colony of South Carolina.  It may have been composed exclusively of expert riflemen from the colony.

History
Listed below are the key events in the history of this unit, the commanders, and known engagements as a unit:
 28 February 1776, authorized as South Carolina Provincial Troops 
 Spring 1776, organized at Charleston to consist of five companies from northwestern South Carolina. 
 25 March 1776, adopted into the Continental Army and assigned to the Southern Department
 18 October 1776, reorganized to consist of six companies (Captain Richbourg's Independent Company, organized in spring 1776 at Charleston with personnel from northwestern South Carolina, concurrently redesignated as the 6th Company, 6th South Carolina Regiment).
 23 November 1776, assigned to the 1st South Carolina Brigade, an element of the Southern Department. 
 3 January 1779, relieved from the 1st South Carolina Brigade
 1 February 1779, assigned to the South Carolina Brigade, an element of the Southern Department
 11 February 1780, consolidated with the 2nd South Carolina Regiment

Commanders:
 Major William Henderson (original officer, 1776), as Lt. Col (1778–1780)
 Lt. Col./Col. Thomas Sumter (1776–1778)

Known Engagements:
 28 June 1776, Battle of Sullivan's Island/Fort Moultrie, South Carolina
 1 August 1776, Seneca Town, South Carolina
 8–11 August 1776, Cherokee Towns, South Carolina
 12 August 1776, Tamassee, South Carolina
 September 1776, St. Augustine, Florida
 19 September 1776, Coweecho River, North Carolina
 May–July 1778, Florida Expedition
 29 December 1778, Capture of Savannah, Georgia
 3 March 1779, Battle of Briar/Brier Creek, Georgia
 3 May 1779, Coosawhatchie, South Carolina
 20 June 1779, Battle of Stono Ferry, South Carolina
 16 September – 18 October 1779, Siege of Savannah, Georgia

See also
 South Carolina Line: 1st, 2nd, 3rd, 4th, 5th, 6th Regiments
 List of South Carolina militia units in the American Revolution

References

 Bibliography of the Continental Army in South Carolina compiled by the United States Army Center of Military History

South Carolina regiments of the Continental Army
Military units and formations established in 1776
Military units and formations disestablished in 1780